Jeremiah Tilmon Jr. (born November 25, 1998) is an American professional basketball player for the Raptors 905 of the NBA G League. He played college basketball for the Missouri Tigers.

High school career
Tilmon played basketball for East St. Louis Senior High School in East St. Louis, Illinois. He transferred to La Lumiere School in La Porte, Indiana for his junior season, averaging 13.2 points and 8.2 rebounds per game for one of the best teams in the country. He dislocated his left shoulder at the High School Nationals title game and underwent surgery. He returned to East St. Louis for his senior season. He averaged 15.3 points, 11 rebounds and four blocks per game and was a First Team All-State selection. He originally committed to playing college basketball for Illinois but reopened his recruitment after coach John Groce was fired. Tilmon later committed to Missouri, choosing the Tigers over Kansas and North Carolina.

College career
Before his freshman season at Missouri, Tilmon was arrested for a Minor in Possession. As a freshman, he averaged 8.2 points and 4.2 rebounds per game in a starting role. On December 18, 2018, Tilmon recorded a sophomore season-high 23 points and 10 rebounds in a 71–56 win over Xavier. As a sophomore, he averaged 10.1 points and 5.9 rebounds per game. Tilmon declared for the 2019 NBA draft before withdrawing his name and returning to college. As a junior, he averaged 8.2 points and 4.4 rebounds per game and was limited to 17 games due to a foot injury. Tilmon declared for the 2020 NBA draft but returned to Missouri for his senior season. On January 30, 2021, he posted 33 points and 11 rebounds in a 102–98 overtime victory over TCU. As a senior, Tilmon averaged 12.4 points, 7.3 rebounds and 1.4 blocks per game. He was named to the Second Team All-SEC.

Professional career

Lakeland Magic (2021–2022)
After going undrafted in the 2021 NBA draft, Tilmon joined the Orlando Magic for the 2021 NBA Summer League. On October 7, 2021, Tilmon signed with the Magic, but was waived five days later. On October 28, he joined the Lakeland Magic as an affiliate player and in 45 games, he averaged 9.7 points, 5.1 rebounds and 1.6 assists in 20.5 minutes.

Hamilton Honey Badgers (2022)
On May 3, 2022, Tilmon signed with the Hamilton Honey Badgers of the CEBL. On August 14, he won the franchise's first CEBL championship with the Honey Badgers.

Raptors 905 (2022–present)
On December 28, 2022, Tilmon was traded to the Raptors 905. On January 25, 2023, Tilmon was acquired as a returning player.

Career statistics

College

|-
| style="text-align:left;"| 2017–18
| style="text-align:left;"| Missouri
| 33 || 33 || 19.4 || .564 || – || .526 || 4.2 || .5 || .2 || 1.0 || 8.2
|-
| style="text-align:left;"| 2018–19
| style="text-align:left;"| Missouri
| 31 || 30 || 24.2 || .545 || .000 || .681 || 5.9 || .6 || .5 || .8 || 10.1
|-
| style="text-align:left;"| 2019–20
| style="text-align:left;"| Missouri
| 17 || 11 || 19.9 || .589 || .333 || .627 || 4.4 || .6 || .3 || 1.2 || 8.2
|-
| style="text-align:left;"| 2020–21
| style="text-align:left;"| Missouri
| 24 || 23 || 27.6 || .614 || – || .526 || 7.3 || .9 || .8 || 1.4 || 12.4
|- class="sortbottom"
| style="text-align:center;" colspan="2"| Career
| 105 || 97 || 22.8 || .574 || .250 || .580 || 5.4 || .6 || .5 || 1.1 || 9.7

References

External links
Missouri Tigers bio
USA Basketball bio

1998 births
Living people
American expatriate basketball people in Canada
American men's basketball players
Basketball players from Illinois
Centers (basketball)
Hamilton Honey Badgers players
Lakeland Magic players
La Lumiere School alumni
Missouri Tigers men's basketball players
Raptors 905 players
Sportspeople from East St. Louis, Illinois